October Faction was one of the many off-shoots of punk band Black Flag.  A supergroup of SST alumni that mixed jazz and hard rock mainly as an instrumental vehicle, the band included Chuck Dukowski (SWA, ex-Black Flag) on bass and vocals, Greg Ginn (Black Flag) on guitar, Greg Cameron (SWA) on drums, Joe Baiza (Saccharine Trust) on guitar, and Tom Troccoli (Tom Troccoli's Dog and Black Flag roadie) on blues harp and vocals. Never an actual working band as much as an occasional jam band, the band released a live recording in 1985 (with Bill Stevenson sitting in for Greg Cameron, who was unable to perform but who appeared on the album's cover) and studio LP in 1986.

Discography 
October Faction (SST Records, 1985)
Second Factionalization (SST Records, 1986)
"I Was Grotesque" on The Blasting Concept, Vol. 2 compilation (SST Records, 1986)

See also 
Gone
Black Flag
SWA
Saccharine Trust

Punk rock groups from California
SST Records artists
Musicians from Redondo Beach, California